The San Juan Islands are a small archipelago in the Alaska Panhandle, located 53 miles east of Sitka, in Pybus Bay on the southeast flank of Admiralty Island.

References

Landforms of Hoonah–Angoon Census Area, Alaska
Archipelagoes of Alaska
Archipelagoes of the Pacific Ocean